This article discusses the influence of folk music on the work of the composer Joseph Haydn (1732–1809).

Background
Haydn was of humble family, perhaps unusually so for a famous composer. His parents were working people (his mother Anna Maria was a former cook, his father Mathias a master wheelwright). They lived in an obscure rural village, and had no musical training. This is not to say they were unmusical, however. Mathias was evidently a folk musician; according to Haydn's own testimony, his father 'played the harp without reading a note of music', having taught himself the instrument while a journeyman. According to the oldest biographies of Haydn (written with the help of interviews with the composer), the Haydn family frequently sang together as well as with their neighbors. The early Haydn biographer Georg August Griesinger, based on interviews with the composer, wrote
Nature ... had endowed [Mathias] with a good tenor voice, and his wife, Anne-Marie [Anna Maria], used to sing to the harp. The melodies of these songs were so deeply impressed in Joseph Haydn's memory that he could still recall them in advanced old age.

Before he reached the age of six, Haydn was sent away from his family to receive formal musical training. But since even at this tender age, the child was already showing musical talent (he recalled, "As a boy of five I sang all [my father's] simple easy pieces correctly"), it seems fair to say that Haydn began his musical career as a folk musician.

Many scholars have argued that this early connection to folk music remained with him for the rest of his life: that throughout his career, Haydn took advantage of folk tunes, deploying them in strategic locations in his music. Haydn's early biographer Giuseppe Carpani claimed that the adult Haydn even did field work, collecting folk songs from the people as did Bartók and Vaughan Williams over a century later.

Sources of tunes
Haydn is claimed to have borrowed folk tunes from several ethnic groups, including Austrians, Gypsies, and Croatians. The attribution of a tune to a particular ethnicity is not at all straightforward, because (as David Schroeder notes) "folk tunes are frequently transmitted across national boundaries". Schroeder give the following cautionary tale: "The source for a tune in the opening movement of an early cassation for string quintet (Hob. II:2) is identified by [Franjo] Kuhač as a Croatian drinking song, 'Nikaj na svetu', and by [Ernst Fritz] Schmid as a German folksong, 'Es trieb ein Schaefer den Berg hinan' ". With this precaution in mind, here are some of the folk sources that have been adduced for Haydn's music.

Austrian folk music
The "Capriccio in G major on the folksong 'Acht Sauschneider müssen sein'", Hob. XVII:1 (1765), is an example of an Austrian folk tune seen in Haydn's music. This work is a theme and variations on a children's song; for lyrics and discussion see this link. In addition, much of Haydn's dance music is claimed to be based on Austrian folk models.

Gypsy music
A more important influence on Haydn was the work of the gypsy musicians. These musicians were, in the strictest sense, not folk musicians, but professionals who had a strong folk background. They occasionally wrote down their compositions or had them written down for them.

The gypsy musicians were employed by Haydn's patrons, the wealthy Eszterházy family, for two purposes. They traveled from inn to inn with military recruiters, playing the verbunkos or recruitment dance. They also were retained to play light entertainment music in the palace courtyard. On such occasions, Haydn was virtually certain to have heard their music; and some scholars have suggested that Haydn may have occasionally incorporated Gypsy musicians into his ensemble.

Haydn paid tribute to the gypsy musicians in (at least) three of his compositions.
 His most famous piano trio, Hob XV:25 in G major, concludes with a movement that Haydn called (in the published English version) "Rondo in the Gypsies' Stile".
 The minuet of his String Quartet Opus 20 no. 4 was marked by Haydn as "Alla zingarese", which is Italian for "in the Gypsy style". This minuet has the interesting property of being written in 3/4 time, but sounding to the ear like 2/4.
 The finale of Keyboard Concerto in D is marked Rondo all'ungherese. This is generally taken to refer to gypsy music and not Hungarian folk music—in fact, authentic Hungarian folk music was not widely known until much later, when fieldwork was carried out by Béla Bartók and others.

Croatian folk music
The researcher who first propounded the view that Haydn's music abounds in Croatian folk tunes was the Croatian ethnologist Franjo Kuhač, who gathered a great number of Croatian tunes in field work. Kuhač's views, published in Croatian in his Josip Haydn i hrvatske narodne popievke (Zagreb, 1880) were made better known in English speaking countries by the musicologist Henry Hadow in his book A Croatian Composer (1897) and in various editions of the Grove Dictionary). Kuhač and Hadow published a number of cases of Croatian folk tunes gathered in field work judged to have been incorporated into Haydn's compositions.

It is no barrier to this theory that Haydn never visited Croatia. The Austro-Hungarian border region in which the composer spent his first years included a large number of people living in Croatian ethnic enclaves.

Here are themes from Haydn's work held to have originated in Croatian folk music.
 The opening theme of the finale of Haydn's Symphony No. 104 (the "London" Symphony) is said to be based on the Croatian traditional song "Oj, Jelena, Jelena, jabuka zelena" ("Oh, Helen, Helen, green apple of mine").
 The finale of the "Drumroll" Symphony no. 103 begins with a theme claimed to be based on the Croatian folk song Divojčica potok gazi ("A little girl treads on a brook").
 The tune of what is now the German national anthem was written by Haydn—paradoxically, to serve as a patriotic song for Austria. The tune is held to have its roots in an old folk song known in Medjimurje and northern regions of Croatia under the name "Stal se jesem". For details, see "Gott erhalte Franz den Kaiser".
 A song widely known in Croatia, Nikaj na svetu lepšega ni, nego gorica kad nam rodi...(Nothing more beautiful in the world than a fruitful hill), has been detected in an early work by Haydn, the Cassation in G major (1765).

Differences between folk versions and Haydn's versions
Sometimes, a folk tune (as notated by field workers) and the version in Haydn's work are identical. Often, however, there is divergence, with Haydn's version being less symmetrical and musically more interesting and expressive. As Hadow pointed out, the versions typically are closely similar at the beginning, divergent at the end. Under one view, this would reflect Haydn's creativity as a composer; starting with the kernel of the tune occurring at the beginning, Haydn elaborated it in ways grounded in his own Classical musical language. Another possibility is given below.

The reverse-transmission theory
Whenever it is claimed that Haydn employed a folk tune in his works, caution must be exercised, because we cannot be guaranteed that the direction of transmission was necessarily to, rather than from, Haydn. The alternative hypothesis is that the folk tunes collected by fieldworkers represent folklorically altered versions of tunes originally by Haydn and disseminated in altered form among the people. The musicologist Michel Brenet states the hypothesis as follows.
Why should not the terms of the proposition be reversed? During the time Haydn lived at Eisenstadt or Esterháza, when his music resounded day and night in the castle and gardens of his Prince, why should not his own airs, or scraps at least of his own melodies, have stolen through the open windows and remained in the memories, first of the people whose duty it was to interpret them, and then of the scattered population of the surrounding country?

The reverse-transmission theory would offer a rather different explanation for why Haydn's versions of the tunes resemble the folk versions more at the beginning than elsewhere – it would be the beginning that would most likely be well remembered by folk singers, and the later passages that, diverging most from folk style, would be most likely to be altered.

Concerning the possibility of reverse transmission, it is conceivable that we have some testimony from Haydn himself. In his oratorio The Seasons, the composer depicted a rural plowman whistling a tune from his own "Surprise" Symphony. We cannot know at this stage whether this was meant as a little joke, or whether Haydn had actually noticed that his catchiest tunes were somehow percolating from the concert hall to the countryside.

Haydn and Croatian ethnicity

Franjo Kuhac, who attributed many tunes in Haydn's music to Croatian folk music, went further than this and advanced the theory that Haydn knew so many Croatian folk tunes because he was himself Croatian; that is to say, a member of the Croatian ethnic minority residing in eastern Austria. The proposal led to extensive controversy and is no longer considered valid by mainstream musicologists. For discussion, see Joseph Haydn's ethnicity.

Learned borrowings from other nationalities

Like other composers who came from less humble backgrounds, Haydn sometimes would set folksongs from other countries. These fall into a different category from the cases given above, since Haydn obtained these songs through learned channels rather than through folkloric transmission.

The second movement of the Symphony No. 85, "La Reine" is described by H. C. Robbins Landon as "a set of variations on the old French folk-song 'La gentille et jeune Lisette' ". This was an appropriate choice since the 85th Symphony is one of the "Paris" symphonies, written on commission for a Parisian audience.

Like Koželuch, Beethoven and Weber after him, Haydn made a great number of arrangements of Scottish and Welsh folksongs for British publishers (including Napier, George Thomson, and William Whyte); this activity began in 1791 and continued from time to time to the very end of Haydn's compositional career, ca. 1804. The arrangements are set for high voice and piano trio, and include versions of "Barbara Allen" and "The Border Widow's Lament".

Notes

Sources

Further reading
 
 Hadow, Henry (1897) Haydn: A Croatian Composer, London, 1897.
 Larsen, Jens Peter (1982) The New Grove Haydn. New York and London: W. W. Norton. 
 The "reverse-transmission" theory noted above is mentioned by Charles Rosen in his book The Classical Style (2nd ed., New York: Norton, 1997).
 Schmid, Ernst Fritz (1934) Joseph Haydn: ein Buch von Vorfahren und Heimat des Meisters. Kassel: Bärenreiter-Verlag.

External links
 Excerpts from the book A Croatian Composer: Notes toward the study of Joseph Haydn, by William Henry Hadow
 Lyrics, translation, and commentary on the Austrian folk song "Acht Sauschneider"

Folk music
Folk music, Haydn and